Thixton is a neighborhood of Louisville, Kentucky centered along Bardstown Road and Thixton Lane.

References
 

Neighborhoods in Louisville, Kentucky